Massimo Bertolini (born 30 May 1974) is a retired professional tennis player from Italy. 

Bertolini had a career high ATP singles ranking of World No. 329, achieved on 1 May 1995. He also had a career high ATP doubles ranking of World No. 36, achieved on 3 May 2004.

A doubles specialist, Bertolini reached 34 doubles finals across his career with a record of 14 wins and 20 losses. Included among those results, he went 12–14 in ATP Challenger Tour finals as well as winning two ATP Tour titles (2–5 overall record). He also reached two Grand Slam quarter-finals, at the 2001 US Open and the 2003 French Open.

ATP career finals

Doubles: 7 (2 titles, 5 runner-ups)

ATP Challenger and ITF Futures finals

Doubles: 27 (12–15)

Performance timeline

Doubles

External links
 
 
 

1974 births
Living people
Italian male tennis players
Sportspeople from Verona
Tennis players at the 2000 Summer Olympics
Mediterranean Games gold medalists for Italy
Mediterranean Games medalists in tennis
Competitors at the 1993 Mediterranean Games
Olympic tennis players of Italy